Monte Sant'Angelo Mercy College (commonly referred to as Monte Sant'Angelo or Monte) is an independent Roman Catholic single-sex secondary day school for girls, located in North Sydney, on the lower north shore of Sydney, New South Wales, Australia.

Founded by the Sisters of Mercy in 1875, Monte is the oldest independent girls school on Sydney's north shore, and caters for approximately 1,600 students from Year 7 to Year 12.
 
The College is affiliated with the Association of Heads of Independent Schools of Australia (AHISA), the Australasian Mercy Secondary Schools Association (AMSSA), the Alliance of Girls Schools Australasia (AGSA), and is an affiliate member of the Association of Heads of Independent Girls' Schools (AHIGS).

Since 2007, Monte has offered its students the option of the International Baccalaureate Diploma (IB) program. Including the MYP and SYP programs.

History
Monte Sant'Angelo is the oldest independent girls' school on Sydney's north shore. The College was established in 1865, on the corner of Miller and McLaren Street, North Sydney, by Mother Ignatius McQuoin of the Sisters of Mercy.  By 1879, the school had outgrown its original site and subsequently moved to its current location at Miller Street. The name of the College is taken from Monte Sant'Angelo, a centre of religion, culture and learning in Gargano, Italy.

Principals

Campus
Monte Sant'Angelo is situated on a single campus centrally located in North Sydney. The college facilities include multi-purpose courts, a library, a religious education centre, a creative arts and technology building, music rooms, a chapel, and an indoor swimming pool in McQuoin Center and sports centre.

Co-curriculum

Sport
Monte offers a variety of sporting activities to its students including aerobics, athletics, basketball, cricket, dance, fencing, gymnastics, hockey, netball, softball, swimming, soccer, tennis, touch football, Tae Kwon Do, volleyball, and water polo.

Musicals
Monte associates with all-boys schools such as Aloysius, Marist, Shore, Riverview and Joeys to create a musical.
The musical Annie was performed in 2008. In 2009, the Broadway musical Les Misérables was performed with a collaboration from Aloys and St. Mary's male students. The school musicals are performed every second year.

In 2012 Monte collaborated with local boys schools to produce a stage version of Beauty and the Beast and in 2014, Hairspray. In 2018 Monte collaborated with other local boys' schools for their production of High School Musical. In March 2020 the school was due to produce several performances of Wicked, which were suspended due to the COVID-19 pandemic.

House plays
House plays are musicals that each colour house choreographs and later performs. The plays are run by the year eleven students, who choose music, dance routines, story line and performance costumes for their house. Practices are held on Fridays and Saturdays at the school. The performance is generally held on a Saturday, with a matinee performance added to the schedule in 2009. The criteria of House Plays are usually the theme and message, but visuals and music are also judged.

Houses
Monte has six colour houses named after patron saints and prominent Sisters of Mercy. These houses compete against each other in school events such as Swimming Carnivals, Athletics Carnivals and House Plays.
 Aquinas (Yellow)
 McQuoin (Blue)
 McAuley (Green)
 McGuirk (Purple)
 Xavier (Red)
 Rankin (Orange)

Notable alumnae 

Media, entertainment and the arts
 Penny Flanagan – musician and novelist
 Kitty Flanagan – comedian, writer and actor
 Antonia Kidman – journalist and television presenter, younger sister of actress Nicole Kidman
 Simone Young – conductor
 Jodie Speers- Journalist
Politics, public service and the law
 Kerry Chikarovski – former NSW Liberal Opposition Leader
 Jackie Kelly – Federal Liberal Member of Parliament
 Robyn Read – former Independent NSW Member of Parliament for North Shore; Alderman, North Sydney Council and author.
 Jacqueline Gleeson – High Court Judge  of Australia
 Kathleen Farrell – Judge Federal Court of Australia

Science and medicine
 Margery Scott-Young – surgeon

See also 

 List of Catholic schools in New South Wales
 Catholic education in Australia

References

External links
 Monte Sant'Angelo Mercy College website

Educational institutions established in 1875
Catholic secondary schools in Sydney
Girls' schools in New South Wales
Association of Heads of Independent Girls' Schools
Sisters of Mercy schools
International Baccalaureate schools in Australia
1875 establishments in Australia
North Sydney, New South Wales